Mary Lee Smith is an American researcher and academic, whose work spanned across fields from psychology, to research methodology, to education reform. She is a Regents' Professor Emeritus of education policy and measurement, statistics, and research methodology at Arizona State University. Smith, along with Gene Glass, were known for their pioneering work in using meta-analyses for reporting research outcomes.

Education
Smith attended the University of Colorado Boulder on a scholarship for her undergraduate studies. Going against advice to become a high school teacher, Smith returned to the University of Colorado Boulder to earn a PhD in counseling psychology.

Career
Following her doctorate, Smith joined the faculty at the University of Colorado in research methodology. There, she worked closely with Gene Glass in incorporating meta-analyses into research. Interviews conducted by Morton Hunt revealed that Smith worked along Glass in locating the studies, constructing the sample, assessing the materials, coding, and calculating effect sizes. Smith and Glass were later co-principal investigators on several important studies using meta-analyses in psychology, and together with Thomas Miller, published the book Benefits of Psychotherapy in 1980.

Later on, Smith became a faculty member at Arizona State University, where her research interests focused on school and education policy. She has published numerous publications on education policy, and published the book, Political Spectacle and the Fate of American Schools in 2003.

Selected publications

References

21st-century American psychologists
Living people
Year of birth missing (living people)
Arizona State University faculty
University of Colorado faculty